Cave Branch is a stream in Hickman County, Tennessee, in the United States.

A large cave near the mouth of Cave Branch caused its name to be selected.

See also
List of rivers of Tennessee

References

Rivers of Hickman County, Tennessee
Rivers of Tennessee